Glipa hilaris is a species of beetle in the genus Glipa. It was described in 1835.

References

hilaris
Beetles described in 1835